Rooftop is the second studio album from Swedish singer-songwriter Ulrik Munther released through Universal Music Sweden. Released on 6 March 2013 to coincide with his performance during Melodifestivalen 2013, it includes his rendition during the competition titled "Tell the World I'm Here" first performed on 23 February 2013 reaching the final stage of the competition finishing third in the finals held on 9 March 2013.

Singles
 The first single from Rooftop was "San Francisco Says Hello", released on December 5, 2012 to iTunes with a single containing the radio edit and album version of the song.
 Munther's song for Melodifestivalen 2013, "Tell the World I'm Here", was released officially as the album's second single on February 24, 2013. It entered at #21 on the Swedish Singles Chart in its first week, before climbing to and peaking at #11 the next week.
 "Requiem" was released as the third single on July 20, 2013, with a single on iTunes containing two remixes of the song (one containing additional vocals from Swingfly), an acoustic version.

Track listing

Charts

References

2013 albums
Ulrik Munther albums